I Love Trouble is a 1948 American film noir crime film written by Roy Huggins from his first novel The Double Take, directed by S. Sylvan Simon, and starring Franchot Tone as Stuart Bailey.  The character of Stuart Bailey was later portrayed by Efrem Zimbalist, Jr. in the television series 77 Sunset Strip.

Plot
A wealthy politician, Ralph Johnson, hires detective Stuart Bailey to investigate his missing wife's background. Bailey discovers that the wife had been a dancer under her maiden name of Jane Breeger and had left her Oregon home town with Buster Buffin, a nightclub entertainer, who says Jane changed her name to Janie Joy and enrolled at UCLA. Buffin is killed before Bailey can question him further.

Norma Shannon shows up, looking for her sister Jane, but when Bailey shows her a photograph of the missing woman, Norma says it's not her. Bailey learns that the wife had used stolen papers from a girlfriend to enter college after she stole $40,000 from the club where she worked, owned by a man named Keller.

The detective eventually learns that Johnson had killed his wife when he had himself discovered her past, in order to avoid a scandal, and that he had hired the detective in order to frame him for the killing.

Cast
 Franchot Tone as Stuart Bailey
 Janet Blair as Norma Shannon
 Janis Carter as Mrs. Caprillo aka Jane Breeger aka Janie Joy
 Adele Jergens as Boots Nestor
 Glenda Farrell as Hazel Bixby
 Steven Geray as Keller
 Tom Powers as Ralph Johnson
 Lynn Merrick as Mrs. Johnson
 John Ireland as Reno
 Sid Tomack as Buster Buffin (uncredited)
 Donald Curtis as Martin
 Eduardo Ciannelli as John Vega Caprillo
 Robert Barrat as Lt. Quint
 Raymond Burr as Herb
 Garry Owen as Gus (uncredited)

Production
The novel and film were written by Roy Huggins, and is laced with a comedic sophistication evident in his subsequent work. In Huggins' Archive of American Television interview, he notes that I Love Trouble was somehow lost and had not been seen anywhere for decades and never run on television, but the film has since been found and screened in venues such as the Museum of Modern Art in New York City. Huggins later created numerous landmark television series such as Maverick starring James Garner, The Fugitive starring David Janssen, The Rockford Files starring Garner, and 77 Sunset Strip starring Efrem Zimbalist, Jr. as Stuart Bailey. I Love Trouble was Huggins' first brush with making narrative film.

Shown on the Turner Classic Movies show 'Noir Alley' with Eddie Muller on September 24, 2022.

See also
 List of American films of 1948
 Public domain film
 List of films in the public domain in the United States

References

External links

 
I Love Trouble at filmsnoir.net

Film noir
American detective films
1948 films
1948 crime films
American black-and-white films
Columbia Pictures films
Films scored by George Duning
Films directed by S. Sylvan Simon
Films based on American novels
1948 mystery films
American mystery films
1940s American films